Juan Flores was a professional association footballer from Peru. He played primarily as a forward.

Club career
During his career, Flores played for Mariscal Sucre FBC and in the 1937 Campeonato Peruano de Fútbol season he finished as the league's top scorer.

References

Year of birth missing
Year of death missing
Peruvian footballers
Peruvian Primera División players
Association football forwards
Mariscal Sucre players